Pontevedra Viva is a Galician daily online newspaper founded in Pontevedra (Spain) in 2012.

It focuses on news related to the city of Pontevedra and the province of Pontevedra. It also deals with national and international issues.

The newspaper is published in Spanish and Galician. Its audience or number of readers is 207,399 in July 2022.

References

See also

External links 
 Website of the newspaper Pontevedra Viva

Publications established in 2012
Daily newspapers published in Spain
Pontevedra
2012 establishments in Spain
Mass media in Galicia (Spain)
Spanish-language newspapers published in Spain
Galician-language newspapers
Spanish news websites
Mass media in Pontevedra